The Škoda Rapid (NH) is range of small family car models produced by the Czech manufacturer Škoda Auto. It consists of three body styles: a 5-door liftback, a 5-door hatchback marketed as "Spaceback" and a 4-door sedan sold in China. The model is based on a B-segment-focused PQ25 platform. Another vehicle with the Rapid nameplate was also introduced in India in 2011, which is a rebadged and restyled Volkswagen Vento/Polo sedan.

The liftback in its production form was first shown to the public in September 2012, when it was officially shown at the Paris Motor Show. Sales started in Czech Republic from 20 October 2012, and commenced at the end of 2012 in other parts of central and western Europe, with sales and production in Russia starting at the beginning of 2014.

The hatchback marketed as the Rapid Spaceback premiered at the Frankfurt Motor Show in 2013, with production starting subsequently. Since 2019, the successor to the Rapid in Western and Central Europe is the Škoda Scala, with the Rapid being given a facelift for the Russian market in 2020 due to its continuing popularity.

The "Rapid" name was previously used in the 1930s for the Škoda Rapid (1935–47) and in the 1980s for the rear engine Škoda Rapid (1984) coupé.

5-door liftback (NH3)

The Rapid liftback (Typ NH3) was the first Škoda model to fully feature brand's new design language. Its minimalistic appearance, developed by Škoda chief designer Jozef Kabaň, was first featured by the Skoda MissionL concept car which was showcased at the 2011 Frankfurt Motor Show. The car was intended to fit between the Fabia and the third generation Octavia, where Škoda had a gap after the Octavia Tour had been discontinued in 2011.

Its overall dimensions were quite similar to the Octavia Tour, but the Rapid offered more space for rear passengers due to its longer wheelbase (2,602 mm vs 2,578 mm). Despite increasing interior space while reducing outer dimensions, the boot shrunk only by 35 litres (550 L vs 585 L). Payload remained the same as in the Octavia Tour (535 kg, including driver).

The Rapid line-up features three petrol engines and one diesel with various power outputs, all compliant to Euro 5 standards. Several of the petrol units have also been Euro 6 compliant since 2015. All engines are four cylinder, except the base 1.2 petrol which is a three-cylinder unit 7-speed DSG is standard for the top of the range 1.4 litre TSI petrol engine, and option for the 1.6 litre diesel with 66 KW.

Trim levels are Active, Ambition and Elegance in most markets, or S, SE and Elegance in the United Kingdom. The GreenLine model with CO2 emissions of 99 g/km was available since 2013. All models sold within the Europe are equipped with ESC and six airbags (front and side for driver and passenger, curtain airbags).

At the 32nd GTI Treffen (2013) Škoda presented the Rapid Sport with bi colour body and 19" alloy wheels.

Facelifts 
Rapid was facelifted in 2017. It received modified front fascia and new headlights, which can be equipped with bi-xenon headlamps with LED lights. Assistance systems were added and the cabin received a slightly modified dashboard. The basic motor instead of 1.2 MPI (55 kW) is now the 1.0 TSI (70 kW), while the 1.2 TSI engine was completely removed.

The liftback Rapid was facelifted for the second time in late 2019 for Russian and CIS markets, bringing significant styling and equipment updates. The 2020 Skoda Rapid gains a new face with triangular LED headlights that are similar to the Scala hatchback, a redesigned bumper with a sportier design, and the brand's hexagonal corporate grille.

At the rear, it featured the L-shaped LED taillights. Also new are the subtle deck lid spoiler, the refreshed bumper, and the "Skoda" lettering on the tailgate. The interior overhaul featured a very similar layout with the Scala and gaining several new features, which include a digital instrument panel, the latest infotainment system featuring a 6.5-inch "floating" touchscreen display (optionally available as an 8-inch unit), two USB-C outlets on the center console, and heated steering wheel.

5-door hatchback (Rapid Spaceback; NH1)

The original Rapid liftback was followed by a hatchback called Rapid Spaceback (Typ NH1) in September 2013 (both exhibition premiere and market launch). The Spaceback shares the wheelbase and front panels of the liftback, and uses a station wagon body, but with a shortened rear overhang and a correspondingly shortened rear section, following the formula pioneered in the 1970s, by Opel/Vauxhall, with their Opel Kadett City/Vauxhall Chevette.  Despite the "sporty" fastback shape of the rear, luggage capacity is rated at between 415 and 1380 litres, according to whether or how the rear seat is folded.

A range of four petrol/gasoline, and two diesel engines offering maximum power outputs ranging from 75–122 PS (55–90 kW; 74–120 bhp) is the same as in the Rapid.  The same counts for the equipment. With launch of the Spaceback, the European Rapid models were given optional low power dipped beam xenon headlights. Due to the high intensity of xenon lamps, by law, if xenon headlights are fitted, headlight washers and dynamic headlight range adjustment must also be used.

Both measures are aimed at maintaining the light beam at a constant volume and angle relative to the road surface in order to avoid dazzling other road users. The luminous flux of xenon headlights in the Rapid models is 2,000 lumens, so there is no need to install a headlight washer system or dynamic range adjustment.

The Rapid Spaceback comes with a lockable fuel cap included in the central locking system. This means there is no need to unlock the fuel cap with car keys, the ice scraper is protected from theft, and can be removed only after the car has been unlocked. This change was announced to arrive to the Rapid liftback, too.

List of features of the Rapid Spaceback includes an optional false boot floor added. The false floor reduces the height difference between the loading sill and the boot floor and eliminates the step created when the rear seat backs are folded down. There is hidden storage space of up to 135 mm under the false boot floor.

While the Rapid in China is an alternate variant of the Volkswagen Santana, the Spaceback produced in co-operation with SVW is the European model.

4-door sedan 
There are two Škoda 4-door sedan models bearing the Rapid badge. In China the Rapid shares body panels and other principal elements with the 2012 Chinese Volkswagen Santana, while still featuring identical front fascias with the European liftback. 

The Indian manufactured Rapid, launched in 2011, is based on Volkswagen Vento (Polo) sedan which is a completely different model. Despite the European version, both Chinese and Indian models are classic 4-door 3-box sedans.

The Rapid introduced some new 'Simply Clever' details, i.e. double sided mat in the boot (rubber/textile), warning vest holder under driver's seat, removable waste bin in door panelling and ice scraper on the fuel tank flap.

Facelifts 
China's 2020 Škoda Rapid gets a different facelift from the Russia-spec 2020 model. For both the 5-door Spaceback hatchback and 4-door regular sedan, the facelifted Rapid for the Chinese market features new headlights and taillights inspired by the European Scala, an updated grille and refreshed bumpers. The updated interior of the Rapid gains a new 8-inch infotainment system that offers over-the-air updates, and supports both Android Auto and Apple smartphone connectivity. Both the refreshed Rapid and Rapid Spaceback in China are powered by a 1.5 liter four cylinder petrol engine producing 111 PS (109 HP / 82 kW) and 145 Nm (107 lb-ft) of torque. Mated to either a five-speed manual gearbox or a six-speed automatic gearbox, the powertrain already complies with the updated China VI b emissions standard that came into effect since July 2023.

Safety

Related models

Volkswagen Polo (CK; 2020–2022, Russia) 

The 2020 Rapid liftback is used as the basis for the 2020 Volkswagen Polo for the Russian market and neighbouring CIS markets, replacing the Polo Mk5 sedan. The Rapid-based Polo is developed to cut costs instead of having to produce the MQB A0-based Volkswagen Virtus in Russia. To differentiate it from the Rapid, Volkswagen has redesigned the front end inspired by the Jetta A7, with its front bumper and hood panel shared with the Chinese-market Jetta VA3, and a unique rear end styling. The Russian-market Polo was also built at the Volkswagen Group Rus plant in Kaluga, Russia. Car has been suddenly discontinued after only 2 years of the market presence after Volkswagen Group's decision to withdraw entirely from the Russian market after the 2022 Russian invasion of Ukraine.

SEAT Toledo (2012–2019, Europe)

A concept car based on the Toledo Mk4 production model was presented at the 2012 Geneva Motor Show. This vehicle is closely related to the Škoda Rapid as a five door liftback, both are based on an adaptation of the A05+(PQ25) platform and are assembled in the same Škoda factory in Mladá Boleslav.

The Toledo commenced sales in Spain and Portugal towards the end of 2012, and the rest of Europe and Mexico in the beginning of 2013, with the all new Toledo sitting in between the smaller Ibiza supermini and the larger Leon small family car.

Engines
Overview of engines available for the Rapid (NH3) and Rapid Spaceback (NH1).

Petrol engines

Diesel engines

(*) Valid for cars with so called Green tec (Start-Stop, brake energy recovery)

Sales

References

Bibliography
 

Compact cars
Hatchbacks
Sedans
Rapid
Cars introduced in 2012
2020s cars